Crane Valley is a hamlet in the Canadian province of Saskatchewan.

Demographics 

References 

Designated places in Saskatchewan
Excel No. 71, Saskatchewan
Hamlets in Saskatchewan
Division No. 3, Saskatchewan